Retrenchment is a political theory.

Retrenchment may refer also to:
Layoff, also known as retrenchment in Australia, Singapore, South Africa and other countries
Retrenchment (computing)
Retrenchment (military), a technical term in military fortification